Cory Robert Luebke (born March 4, 1985) is an American former professional baseball pitcher. He played in Major League Baseball (MLB) for the San Diego Padres and Pittsburgh Pirates.

Amateur career
A native of Maria Stein, Ohio, Luebke attended Marion Local High School and Ohio State University. In 2006, he played collegiate summer baseball with the Falmouth Commodores of the Cape Cod Baseball League. He was selected by the Padres in the first round of the 2007 Major League Baseball draft.

Professional career

Minor leagues
Luebke spent his first professional season, 2007 at three different levels of the San Diego Padres' organization. He started with the Short-Season Eugene Emeralds of the Northwest League. He went 3–0 with 26 strikeouts and a 1.46 ERA in eight games, three starts. He was soon promoted to the Class-A Fort Wayne Wizards of the Midwest League, where he went 1–2 with 30 strikeouts and a 3.33 ERA in five games, all starts. He was then promoted again to the Class-A Advanced Lake Elsinore Storm of the California League, where he went 1–1 with five strikeouts and a 7.71 ERA in two games, one start. Luebke went a combined 5–3 with 61 strikeouts and a 3.07 ERA in 58 innings pitched.

In 2008 Luebke started the season with the Class-A Advanced Lake Elsinore Storm, but was later sent down to the Class-A Fort Wayne Wizards. With Lake Elsinore he went 3–6 with a 6.84 ERA in 17 games, 15 starts. During his time with Fort Wayne, Luebke went 3–3 with 40 strikeouts and a 2.89 ERA in 10 games, all starts. Luebke went a combined 6–9 with 100 strikeouts with a 5.12 ERA in 128 innings pitched.

He split the 2009 season with the Class-A Advanced Lake Elsinore Storm and the Double-A San Antonio Missions. He began the season with Lake Elsinore for the second consecutive season. He went 8–2 with 80 strikeouts and a 2.34 ERA in 14 games, all starts. He was then promoted to the Missions where he went 3–2 with a 3.70 ERA in nine games, all starts. Luebke went a combined 11–4 with 112 strikeouts and a 2.78 ERA in 129 innings pitched. Luebke attributed his success in '09 to working out kinks in his delivery. He was named the number 12 prospect in the Texas League by Baseball America. Luebke pitched for Team USA in the 2009 Baseball World Cup. He threw a near perfect game against Team Canada. He started the championship game, striking out seven and pitching 4 innings.

On July 11, 2010, Luebke was promoted to the Triple-A Portland Beavers of the Pacific Coast League. While with the San Antonio Missions, Luebke went 5–1 with a 2.40 ERA and a WHIP of 0.94. He made 9 starts with Portland, going 5–0 with a 2.97 ERA.

San Diego Padres
Luebke was promoted to the Padres on September 1, 2010 and made his first major league start on September 3, where he got his first loss, pitching 5 innings and giving up four runs. He earned his first career win in his next start, throwing 6 innings and only giving up 2 hits and 1 walk.

Luebke started 2011 in the Padres bullpen. He pitched in 29 games in relief, posting a 3.23 ERA in 39 innings with 43 strike-outs against 15 walks. On June 26, Luebke was promoted to the Padres starting rotation. He started 17 games, going 8–9 with a 3.31 ERA. Over 100 innings as a starter, he struck out 111 batters and walked 29, holding opposing hitters to a .218 batting average. His success in 2011 raised his profile to that of a front-of-the-rotation starter.

On March 30, 2012, Luebke agreed to a four-year extension with the Padres worth a guaranteed $12 million that includes 2 club options for 2016 and 2017. He received a $500,000 bonus for the deal. He earned $0.5 million in 2012, $1 million in 2013, $3 million in 2014 and $5.25 million in 2015. His 2016 option was worth $7.5 million and had a $1.75 million buyout, and his 2017 option was worth $10 million with a $250,000 buyout. Luebke could have earned up to $27.75 million.

Luebke opened 2012 in the Padres starting rotation and made five starts, going 3–1 with a 2.61 ERA, before being removed from the rotation with elbow tightness and soreness. On May 23, 2012, Cory Luebke underwent Tommy John surgery to repair a partial tear of the ulnar collateral ligament (UCL) in his left elbow, causing him to miss the rest of the 2012 season. Rehabilitation from Tommy John for pitchers usually ranged from 12 to 18 months. Luebke was expected to pitch after the All-Star break in 2013, but he was shut down in September after more than three bullpen sessions. He began throwing again in November. By late December, the team was considering him as a reliever for Opening Day in 2014.

On February 4, 2014, it was announced that Luebke had a tear in the UCL and would need a second reconstructive surgery on his elbow and miss the 2014 season.

Pittsburgh Pirates
On February 11, 2016, the Pirates signed Luebke to a minor league deal. On June 26, he was released.

Miami Marlins
On July 1, 2016, Luebke signed a minor league contract with the Miami Marlins.

Chicago White Sox
On January 17, 2017, Luebke signed a minor league contract with the Chicago White Sox. Luebke retired from baseball on May 8, 2017.

References

External links

1985 births
Living people
People from Mercer County, Ohio
Baseball players from Ohio
Major League Baseball pitchers
San Diego Padres players
Pittsburgh Pirates players
Ohio State Buckeyes baseball players
Falmouth Commodores players
Lake Elsinore Storm players
Fort Wayne Wizards players
Eugene Emeralds players
San Antonio Missions players
Portland Beavers players
El Paso Chihuahuas players
Indianapolis Indians players
Jupiter Hammerheads players
Jacksonville Suns players
New Orleans Zephyrs players
Charlotte Knights players